The 2019–20 National League 2 South was the eleventh season (33rd overall) of the fourth tier (south) of the English domestic rugby union competitions since the professionalised format of the second division was introduced.  

Due to the COVID-19 pandemic in the United Kingdom, the Rugby Football Union officially cancelled the season on 20 March 2020, after an initial postponement of all rugby in England including training.  After the cancellation was announced the RFU used a best playing record formula to decide the final table.  This meant that Taunton Titans, who were 3 points clear when the league was suspended, were promoted as champions along with runners up Tonbridge Juddians, who went up as the best runner up as they had more considerably more points than 2019–20 National League 2 North runner up Fylde.  

The relegated teams included Bournemouth, Old Redcliffians and Sutton & Epsom, all of whom had occupied the bottom three spots before league suspension, with 14th placed Sutton & Epsom 13 points behind 13th placed Westcliff and safety.  Taunton Titans and Tonbridge Juddians will join the 2021–22 National League 1 (the highest level either club have reached), while Bournemouth and Old Redcliffians drop down to South West Premier and Sutton & Epsom to London & South East Premier.  

Other interesting news from the season was Taunton's Gary Kingdom who finished as top scorer in the division for the third time, tying him with Worthing Raiders prolific Matthew McLean.  An unwanted record was also made with Tonbridge Juddians official attendance of 0 from their game Sutton & Epsom on 21 December 2019 being the lowest ever recorded in a National League 2 South game.  This was due to the game being played behind closed doors due to safety concerns caused by flooding.

Structure
The league consists of sixteen teams with all the teams playing each other on a home and away basis to make a total of thirty matches each. There is one automatic promotion place, one play-off place and three relegation places.  The champions are promoted to the 2020–21 National League 1 and the runners-up play the second-placed team in the 2019–20 National League 2 North with the winner being promoted. The last three teams are relegated to either London & South East Premier or South West Premier depending on the geographical location of the team (in some cases teams may join the Midlands regional leagues).

The results of the matches contribute points to the league as follows:

4 points are awarded for a win
2 points are awarded for a draw
0 points are awarded for a loss, however
1 losing (bonus) point is awarded to a team that loses a match by 7 points or fewer
1 additional (bonus) point is awarded to a team scoring 4 tries or more in a match.

Participating teams and locations

Eleven of the teams listed below participated in the 2018–19 National League 2 South season.  The 2018–19 champions Rams and play-off winners Canterbury, who won the promotion play-off against Chester, were promoted into the 2019–20 National League 1, while Esher were relegated into the division from the 2018–19 National League 1.  Sides relegated from the 2018–19 National League 2 South included Birmingham & Solihull (to Greater Birmingham Merit Leagues), Guernsey (London & South East Premier) and London Irish Wild Geese (South West Premier).  In the case of Birmingham & Solihull, they had initially been supposed to drop to Midlands Premier but on further reflection decided to become an amateur club and drop out of the league system. 

The promoted teams are Bournemouth who come up as champions of South West Premier while Sutton & Epsom (champions) and Westcliff (play-off) came up from London & South East Premier.  Leicester Lions were level transferred into the division from National League 2 North in order to address an imbalance of teams in National 2, with Rams and Canterbury being promoted and only Esher dropping down from National League 1.  Although there were several candidates for the level-transfer in the end Leicester Lions were deemed the most suitable due to being the most southerly club in a central position, making access to both the south-east and south-west more straightforward than alternatives such as Luctonians.

Tables

At the date the leagues were suspended, the National League 2 South table read as follows:

On 4 April, the Rugby Football Union confirmed the final table for the season.

Fixture & Results

Round 1

Round 2

Round 3

Round 4

Round 5

Round 6

Round 7

Round 8

Round 9

Round 10

Postponed due to unplayable pitch caused by bad weather (rain).  Game to be rescheduled for 22 February 2020.

Round 11

Round 12

Round 13

Abandoned after 60 minutes due to power cut.  Game eventually rescheduled for 22 February 2020.

Round 14

Round 15

Round 16

Postponed due to unplayable pitch caused by heavy rain.  Game to be rescheduled for 21 February 2020.

Postponed due to unplayable pitch caused by heavy rain.  Game to be rescheduled for 22 February 2020.

Round 17

Round 18

Round 19

Round 20

Round 21

Round 22

Round 23 

Postponed.  Game to be rescheduled for 14 March 2020.

Postponed.  Game to be rescheduled for 14 March 2020.

Postponed.  Game to be rescheduled for 14 March 2020.

Postponed.  Game to be rescheduled for 14 March 2020.

Rounds 10, 13 & 16 (rescheduled games) 

Game rescheduled from 21 December 2019.

Game originally rescheduled from 9 November 2019 but postponed again due to poor weather.  Game to be rescheduled for 11 April 2020.

Game rescheduled from 21 December 2019.

Game rescheduled from 30 November 2019.

Round 24 

Postponed due to unplayable pitch caused by heavy rain.  Game to be rescheduled for 11 April 2020.

Postponed due to unplayable pitch caused by heavy rain.  Game to be rescheduled for 11 April 2020.

Round 25

Round 23 (rescheduled games) 

Game rescheduled from 15 February 2020.

Game originally rescheduled from 15 February 2020 but postponed again due a Dings player being potentially exposed to coronavirus.  Game to be rescheduled.

Game rescheduled from 15 February 2020.

Game rescheduled from 15 February 2020.

Round 26

Round 27

Round 28

Rounds 10 & 24 (rescheduled games)

Game rescheduled from 29 February 2020.

Game rescheduled from 29 February 2020.

Game rescheduled from 9 November 2019 and then 22 February 2020.

Round 29

Round 30

Attendances
 Does not include promotion play-off.

Individual statistics
 Note that points scorers includes tries as well as conversions, penalties and drop goals.

Top points scorers

Top try scorers

Season records

Team
Largest home win — 73 points
83 – 10 Tonbridge Juddians at home to Sutton & Epsom on 21 December 2019
Largest away win — 60 points
74 – 14 Tonbridge Juddians away to Sutton & Epsom on 14 September 2019
Most points scored — 83 points
83 – 10 Tonbridge Juddians at home to Sutton & Epsom on 21 December 2019
Most tries in a match — 13
Tonbridge Juddians at home to Sutton & Epsom on 21 December 2019
Most conversions in a match — 9 (3)
Henley Hawks at home to Worthing Raiders on 5 October 2019
Tonbridge Juddians at home to Taunton Titans on 5 October 2019
Tonbridge Juddians at home to Sutton & Epsom on 21 December 2019
Most penalties in a match — 5 (2)
Worthing Raiders at home to Old Redcliffians on 7 September 2019
Taunton Titans at home to Bury St Edmunds on 23 November 2019
Most drop goals in a match — 1 (3)
Redruth at home to Old Redcliffians on 30 November 2019
Bury St Edmunds at home to Tonbridge Juddians on 14 December 2019
Leicester Lions away to Old Redcliffians on 7 March 2020

Attendances
Highest — 1,076
Dings Crusaders at home to Clifton on 14 September 2019
Lowest — 0
Tonbridge Juddians at home to Sutton & Epsom on 21 December 2019
Highest average attendance — 676	
Redruth
Lowest average attendance — 136	
Leicester Lions

Player
Most points in a match — 26
 Tristan Roberts for Esher away to Barnes on 14 September 2019
Most tries in a match — 4 (2)
 Murray Galbraith-Lowe for Tonbridge Juddians at home to Taunton Titans on 5 October 2019
 Ewan Fenley for Henley Hawks away to Dings Crusaders on 30 November 2019
Most conversions in a match — 9 (3)
 Ben Bolster for Henley Hawks at home to Worthing Raiders on 5 October 2019
 Will Robinson for Tonbridge Juddians at home to Taunton Titans on 5 October 2019
 Will Robinson for Tonbridge Juddians at home to Sutton & Epsom on 21 December 2019
Most penalties in a match — 5 (3)
 Matthew McLean for Worthing Raiders at home to Old Redcliffians on 7 September 2019
 Gary Kingdom for Taunton Titans at home to Bury St Edmunds on 23 November 2019
Most drop goals in a match — 1 (3)
 Fraser Honey for Redruth at home to Old Redcliffians on 30 November 2019
 Kodie Drury-Hawkins for Bury St Edmunds at home to Tonbridge Juddians on 14 December 2019
 Ben Young for Leicester Lions away to Old Redcliffians on 7 March 2020

Notes

See also
 2019–20 National League 2 North
 2019–20 National League 1
 English rugby union system
 Rugby union in England

References

External links
 NCA Rugby

2019–20
4S
National League 2 South